The Abetifi constituency is in the Eastern region of Ghana. The current member of Parliament for the constituency is Bryan Acheampong. He was elected  on the ticket of the New Patriotic Party (NPP) and  won a majority of 9,724 votes more than candidate closest in the race, to win the constituency election to become the MP. He succeeded Peter Wiafe Pepera who had represented the constituency in the 5th Republican parliament on the ticket of the New Patriotic Party (NPP).

Members of Parliament

Elections

See also
List of Ghana Parliament constituencies

References

Parliamentary constituencies in the Eastern Region (Ghana)